Below is the list of players that have scored a hat-trick in a La Liga match since the league's creation, in 1929. Since its creation, more than 100 players have scored at least a hat-trick. Lionel Messi has scored 36 La Liga hat-tricks, making him the player with the most hat-tricks in La Liga history, also jointly holding the record for a single season with eight.

Hat-tricks

Multiple hat-tricks
The following table lists the number of hat-tricks scored by players who have scored ten or more hat-tricks. Boldface indicates a player who is currently active in La Liga.

Hat-tricks by club

See also 

 Football records and statistics in Spain
 List of Bundesliga hat-tricks
 List of Ligue 1 hat-tricks
 List of Premier League hat-tricks
 List of Primeira Liga hat-tricks
 List of Serie A hat-tricks

References

External links
  Liga Nacional de Fútbol Profesional
  Royal Spanish Football Federation

La Liga records and statistics
hat-tricks
La Liga